Maribor Pohorje Ski Resort is the largest ski resort in Slovenia, located just south of Maribor, at the mountain range of Pohorje in Lower Styria.

The resort consists of three sections: lower section "Snow Stadium," middle section "Bolfenk" and an upper section called "Areh". It is best known for its "Golden Fox" competition, women's World Cup races in giant slalom and slalom, held since 1964.

Ski lifts

Snow Stadium
Lower section ( - )

Bolfenk
Middle section ( - )

Areh
Upper section ( - )

References

External links
 
 Snow-forecast.com – Mariborsko Pohorje – webcams
 Ski Map.org – Maribor Pohorje
 FIS World Cup – Maribor – podium finishers

Ski areas and resorts in Slovenia
City Municipality of Maribor
Municipality of Hoče–Slivnica
Pohorje